

This is a list of the National Register of Historic Places listings in Colusa County, California.

This is intended to be a complete list of the properties and districts on the National Register of Historic Places in Colusa County, California, United States. Latitude and longitude coordinates are provided for many National Register properties and districts; these locations may be seen together in a Google map.

There are 6 properties and districts listed on the National Register in the county.

Current listings

|}

See also

List of National Historic Landmarks in California
National Register of Historic Places listings in California
California Historical Landmarks in Colusa County, California

References

Colusa